The Piano Trio No. 4 in E major, K. 542, was written by Wolfgang Amadeus Mozart in 1788. It is scored for piano, violin and cello. It's the only multi-movement composition by Mozart in the key of E major.

Movements 
The work is in three movement form:

References

External links

Piano trios by Wolfgang Amadeus Mozart
Compositions in E major
1788 compositions